Ratification Day in the United States is the anniversary of the congressional proclamation of the ratification of the Treaty of Paris, on January 14, 1784, at the Maryland State House in Annapolis, Maryland, by the Confederation Congress, which marked the official end of the American Revolutionary War.

Proclamation of Congress
The Journals of the Continental Congress reports that the Confederation Congress proclaimed on April 11, 1783, "Declaring the cessation of arms" against Great Britain. Congress approved the preliminary articles of peace on April 15, 1783. The Treaty of Paris was signed on September 3, 1783, and ratified on January 14, 1784.

An excerpt from the proclamation of ratification:

Congressional debate
Due to the severe winter of 1783–1784, delegates from only seven of the thirteen states were present in Congress. According to the Articles of Confederation, nine states were required to enter a treaty. One faction believed that seven states could ratify the treaty, arguing that they were merely ratifying and not entering it. Furthermore, it was unlikely that the required delegates could reach Annapolis before the ratification deadline.

Thomas Jefferson's faction believed that a full nine states were required to ratify the treaty. Any less would be trickery which Britain would eventually find out, giving it an excuse to nullify the treaty. Jefferson stated that it would be a "dishonorable prostitution" of the Great Seal of the United States.

Jefferson's compromise
Jefferson was elected to head a committee of members of both factions and arrived at a compromise. Assuming that only seven states were present, Congress would pass a resolution stating that the seven states present were unanimously in favor of ratification of the treaty but were in disagreement as to the competency of Congress to ratify with only seven states. Although only seven states were present, their unanimous agreement in favor of ratification would be used to secure peace. The vote would not set a precedent for future decisions; the document would be forwarded to the U.S. ministers in Europe, who would be told to wait until a treaty ratified by nine states could arrive, and to request a delay of three months. However, if Britain insisted, the ministers should use the seven-state ratification, pleading that a full Congress was not in session.

In any event, delegates from Connecticut and South Carolina arrived at the last moment, and nine states ratified the treaty. Three copies were sent by separate couriers to ensure delivery.

References

External links
Library of Congress, Documents from the Continental Congress and the Constitutional Convention, 1774–1789
The Story behind the Proclamation of Peace
Yale Law Avalon Project, Treaty of Paris Ratification
The Maryland State House Trust

Peace treaties of the United States
Ordinances of the Continental Congress
1784 in the United States
1783 in the United States
January observances